Navion Boyd (born 10 October 1986) is a Jamaican professional footballer who plays as a striker for Charleston Battery in the USL Professional Division on loan from Tivoli Gardens in the Jamaica National Premier League.

Career

Club

Tivoli Gardens
Boyd became member of his club's senior team, after being promoted from the U21 team.  After starting the 2010–2011 season with outstanding form, Boyd suffered a shoulder injury which kept him out of action for eight weeks. He made his return to action on 15 December 2010. Boyd finished the 2010–2011 DPL season with 11 goals.

Charleston Battery
Boyd spent the 2012 season on loan to American club Charleston Battery along with Tivoli Gardens teammate Dane Kelly.

Boyd returned to the Battery for the 2015 season. On July 17, Boyd scored Charleston's only goal in a 2–1 exhibition loss against West Bromwich Albion of the English Premier League.

International
Since 2008, Boyd is a member of the Jamaica national football team, The Reggae Boyz. Navion Boyd was called up to the senior national team on several occasions in 2009–2010 and featured some friendly matches, however he was unable to participate in the 2010 Caribbean Championship due to injury.

Honours

Club
Tivoli Gardens F.C.
Jamaica National Premier League: 2
 2008–2009,2010–2011

Charleston Battery
USL Pro
 Champions (1): 2012

IndividualJamaica National Premier League MVP: 1 2009–2010Tivoli Gardens MVP: 1'''
 2009–2010

References

External links 
Player profile at FootballDatabase.eu

1986 births
Living people
Jamaican footballers
Jamaican expatriate footballers
Jamaica international footballers
Tivoli Gardens F.C. players
Charleston Battery players
2011 CONCACAF Gold Cup players
Expatriate soccer players in the United States
USL Championship players
Association football wingers
National Premier League players